Horipsestis aenea is a moth in the family Drepanidae. It was described by Wileman in 1911. It is found in Taiwan, the Chinese provinces of Henan, Shaanxi, Gansu, Hubei, Jiangxi, Hunan, Fujian, Guangxi, Hainan, Sichuan and Yunnan and in Vietnam.

Subspecies
Horipsestis aenea aenea (Taiwan)
Horipsestis aenea minor (Sick, 1941) (China: Henan, Shaanxi, Gansu, Hubei, Jiangxi, Hunan, Fujian, Guangxi, Hainan, Sichuan, Yunnan)
Horipsestis aenea roseobasalis Laszlo, G. Ronkay, L. Ronkay & Witt, 2007 (Vietnam)

References

Moths described in 1911
Thyatirinae